The Scholars were an American band. Like the Nuckle Brothers, No Doubt and Reel Big Fish, they are one of the main founding bands of the Orange County ska scene.

The Scholars' lineup changed on a regular basis. Current and former members of Reel Big Fish Aaron Barrett (Guitar/Vocals), Grant Barry (Trombone) and Scott Klopfenstein (Trumpet/Vocals) all played in The Scholars. Jay Layafette, a member of the now defunct O.C. ska band called The Forces of Evil, played trumpet for them in their final days of playing shows. Their singer, Jesse Wilder, fronted a power pop group known as Teen Heroes, and also played Saxophone and Keyboard for The Scholars. He and Scott Klopfenstein later collaborated on a number of projects, including The Littlest Man Band and PAL with Scholars bassist Jake Berry and drummer Greg Parkin.

Their only main release, an 8-song demo called I'm In A Band, can be found on their anthology Last Great Record of The 20th Century on Vegas Records, along with numerous live songs and goofy pre-studio tracks they recorded with a tape deck in their drummer Greg's garage. They were a hit at the local high school Los Alamitos High School, where they were also students. They opened and headlined shows with more unknown local acts such as Exit Smiling, Leonard's Lunchbox, The Nuckle Brothers, The Goodwin Club, Suburban Rhythm and others.

Scott, Jake, Jesse, and Greg later went on to form The Littlest Man Band along with Dan Regan of Reel Big Fish, and Suburban Legends singer Vince Walker.

Reunions
Reel Big Fish announced on their Facebook page that Scott and Aaron would be reuniting with the band for a one-off show for The Ska Parade 20th Anniversary Party at the Glass House, O.C. on 25 September 2010.
The band reunited with Scott Klopfenstein on August 13th, 2021 for the 1st annual Summer Sizzler at the Garden Ampitheatre.

Band members
Jesse Wilder - vocals, Saxophone, Keyboard
Scott Klopfenstein - Trumpet, vocals
Grant Barry - Trombone
Aaron Barrett - Trombone
Jake Berrey - Bass
John Sisk - Guitar
Greg Parkin - drums
Jay Layafette - Trumpet
Mike Barnhill - Rhythm Guitar

Discography

Albums 
 I'm In A Band (Demo)
 Last Great Record of The 20th Century (1998)

American ska punk musical groups
Musical groups from Orange County, California
Third-wave ska groups